In enzymology, a loganate O-methyltransferase is an enzyme that catalyzes the chemical reaction

S-adenosyl-L-methionine + loganic acid  S-adenosyl-L-homocysteine + loganin

Thus, the two substrates of this enzyme are S-adenosyl methionine and loganic acid (also called loganate), whereas its two products are S-adenosylhomocysteine and loganin.

This enzyme belongs to the family of transferases, specifically those transferring one-carbon group methyltransferases.  The systematic name of this enzyme class is S-adenosyl-L-methionine:loganate 11-O-methyltransferase. Other names in common use include loganate methyltransferase, and S-adenosyl-L-methionine:loganic acid methyltransferase.  This enzyme participates in terpene indole and ipecac alkaloid biosynthesis.

References

 

EC 2.1.1
Enzymes of unknown structure